Arab empire or Arabian empire may refer to:

 Rashidun Caliphate
 Umayyad Caliphate
 Abbasid Caliphate

See also 

 Arabs
 Saracen 
 Pan-Arabism
 Arab world
 Caliphate
 Arabian Peninsula
 List of Muslim states and dynasties
 Caliphate of Córdoba
 Fatimid Caliphate
 Ayyubid dynasty